St. Mary's Catholic Church is a parish of the Roman Catholic Church located near Bryantown, Maryland, in the Archdiocese of Baltimore. Established in 1793, it operates a parochial school and houses a large cemetery. St. Mary's Cemetery is most notably the final resting spot of Dr. Samuel Mudd, a physician who set the leg of John Wilkes Booth the day after U.S. President Lincoln's assassination on April 14, 1865.  As such, it is a stop on the Booth's Escape Scenic Byway.

Although Catholic worship in Bryantown was recorded as early as 1654, land for a log cabin church was not set aside until 1743. Construction on the current church began in 1846. It was damaged by fire in 1963, rebuilt, and rededicated in 1966.

References

External links
 

Churches in Charles County, Maryland
Roman Catholic churches in Maryland
Religious organizations established in 1793
1793 establishments in Maryland